Shadow libraries are online databases of readily available content that is normally obscured or otherwise not readily accessible. Such content may be inaccessible for a number of reasons, including the use of paywalls, copyright controls, or other barriers to accessibility placed upon the content by its original owners. Shadow libraries usually consist of textual information like in electronic books but may also include other digital media, including software, music, or films.

Examples of shadow libraries include Anna's Archive, Library Genesis, Sci-Hub and Z-Library, which are popular book and academic shadow libraries and may be the largest public libraries for books and literature.

Motivation 

One of the primary motivations behind the creation of shadow libraries is to more readily disseminate academic content, especially papers from academic journals. Academic literature has become increasingly expensive as costs to access information created by scholars have risen dramatically in recent years, especially the costs of books. The term serials crisis has emerged to describe this ongoing trend in the increased costs of academic literature.

Conversely, the same motivation behind the serials crisis has also given rise to a concerted, international political movement to make academic knowledge free or very cheap, known as the Open Access movement. The Open Access movement strives to establish both journals that are free to access (known as open access journals) and free-to-access repositories of academic journal papers published elsewhere. However, many open access journals require academics to pay fees to be published in an open access journal, which disincentives academics from publishing in such journals.

A tertiary motivator for the establishment of shadow libraries is the tacit endorsement by many academics of such efforts. Academics are rarely compensated by publishers for their work, regardless of whether their work is published in an open access journal or a conventionally priced journal. Thus, there is now little incentive for academics to disavow shadow libraries. Furthermore, shadow libraries actually greatly increase the impact of the academics whose work is available within shadow libraries: according to one study from Cornell University, articles that are on Sci-Hub receive 1.72 times as many citations as articles from journals of similar quality that are not available on Sci-hub.

Legal status 
Content hosted by some shadow libraries may be hosted without the consent of the original owners of the material. This may make some shadow libraries illegal; however, as researchers are not required to disclose the means by which they access academic material, it is difficult to monitor for the use of illegally accessed academic papers. Furthermore, not all authors agree with trying to compromise access to shadow libraries, including the Z-Library, and at least one author, Alison Rumfitt, has come to defend maintaining access to such libraries.

The legality of directing individuals to shadow libraries is broadly undetermined. There is currently no consensus among legal authorities in the United States and Europe as to what extent advertising shadow libraries constitutes a criminal offense. There are currently no settled cases determining whether it is permissible by academics to directly provide links to shadow libraries, though threats of legal action by academic publishers regarding such references have occurred in isolated incidents. Legal action against researchers remains uncommon.

While most academics are not penalized for distributing their published works independently and freely (therefore obviating the need for shadow libraries in the first place), there are reports of academic publishers threatening such academics with legal action.

Used resilience technologies

Shadow libraries (or their content databases) make use of BitTorrent (mainly for database dumps), dark web and IPFS technologies to increase their resilience or distribute loads. In the case of Anna's Archive, the software is developed and made accessible as open source software, enabling code development by any volunteer and mirrors or forks, with the site claiming that "if we get taken down we'll just pop right up elsewhere, since all our code and data is fully open source".

See also

 Anna's Archive
 Guerilla Open Access Manifesto
 #ICanHazPDF (hashtag)
 Intellectual property infringement
 Library Genesis
 Open access
 Open Library
 Sci-Hub
 Z-Library

References 

 
Intellectual property activism
Online databases
Open access (publishing)
Types of library